Charvil is a village and civil parish in Berkshire, England. The 2011 Census recorded the parish's population as 3,042. The area was mostly farmland until the 1950s, since which time the population has increased significantly. Charvil is bisected by the new A4 Bath Road.

Amenities
Charvil has two pubs: The Wee Waif and The Heron on the Ford (formerly The Lands End). Charvil's community centre was built in 1952 as the Church of England church of Saint Patrick but was deconsecrated in 2011. It was later demolished to make room for a housing project in 2019. Charvil is part of the ecclesiastical parish of St Andrew, Sonning. The land between Charvil and Twyford is a nature reserve with footpaths beside the River Loddon and around lakes formed from former gravel pits.

Notable residents
Notable current and former residents include
Uri Geller, illusionist
David Hamilton, radio and television broadcaster
Alan Titchmarsh, television gardener.

Nearby towns and cities

 Henley-on-Thames
 Maidenhead
 Reading
 Woodley

Nearby villages

 Sonning
 Twyford
 Wargrave
 Hurst

References

External links

 Charvil Parish Council

Civil parishes in Berkshire
Villages in Berkshire
Borough of Wokingham